Legienstraße is a metro station on the Hamburg U-Bahn lines U2 and U4. The station was opened in September 1967 and is located in the Hamburg district of Horn, Germany. Horn is part of the borough of Hamburg-Mitte.

Legienstraße is peculiar among Hamburg U-Bahn stations, as its two side platforms are rather wide apart, separated by a green median strip.

Service

Trains 
Legienstraße is served by Hamburg U-Bahn lines U2 and U4; departures are every 5 minutes.

See also 

 List of Hamburg U-Bahn stations

References

External links 

 Line and route network plans at hvv.de 

Hamburg U-Bahn stations in Hamburg
U2 (Hamburg U-Bahn) stations
U4 (Hamburg U-Bahn) stations
Buildings and structures in Hamburg-Mitte
Railway stations in Germany opened in 1967
1967 establishments in West Germany